Dermanyssiae is a "sub-cohort" of mites.

References

Mesostigmata